Maria Chmurkowska (9 January 1901 – 9 June 1979) was a Polish film actress. She appeared in ten films between 1934 and 1967.

Selected filmography
 Love, Cherish, Respect (1934)
 Bolek i Lolek (1936)
 30 karatów szczęścia (1936)

References

External links

1901 births
1979 deaths
Polish film actresses
Actresses from Warsaw
People from Warsaw Governorate
Polish stage actresses
20th-century Polish actresses